August Holtz (February 12, 1871 – March 5, 1938) was a United States Navy sailor and a recipient of the United States military's highest decoration, the Medal of Honor.

Biography
Holtz was born on February 12, 1871, in St. Louis, Missouri and joined the Navy in 1891. On that day, while the North Dakota was conducting tests using oil as fuel, an explosion occurred, killing three sailors and endangering the ship. In the engine room, pieces of hot coal and coke floated in waist-high hot water, oil was aflame above one of the boilers, and the entire room was filled with smoke, steam, and fumes. Despite these dangers, Holtz and five other men of the ship's engineering department entered the engine room to stifle the boiler fires and perform other tasks necessary to prevent a boiler explosion. After ensuring the safety of the ship, they then searched for and removed the bodies of the three sailors killed in the initial explosion.

For these actions, Holtz and the five other men were approved for the Medal of Honor a month later, on October 4. On 13 June 1911, President Taft presented all six heroes with their medal in a ceremony at the White House. The others were Chief Machinist's Mate Thomas Stanton, Chief Machinist's Mate Karl Westa, Chief Watertender Patrick Reid, Machinist's Mate First Class Charles C. Roberts, and Watertender Harry Lipscomb. Holtz left the Navy the same year.

Holtz died at age 67 and was buried at Long Island National Cemetery in Suffolk County, New York.

Medal of Honor citation
Holtz's official Medal of Honor citation reads:
On board the U.S.S. North Dakota, for extraordinary heroism in the line of his profession during the fire on board that vessel, 8 September 1910.

See also

List of Medal of Honor recipients in non-combat incidents

References

1871 births
1938 deaths
Military personnel from St. Louis
United States Navy sailors
United States Navy Medal of Honor recipients
Burials at Long Island National Cemetery
Non-combat recipients of the Medal of Honor